Ronaldo Lindenberg Von Schilgem Cintra Nogueira (born July 17, 1944), better known as Ronnie Von, is a Brazilian singer, businessman and TV show host.

Ronnie became known in the 1960s associated with Brazilian rock, and between 2004 until 2019 presents currently between Mondays and Fridays the TV night show Todo Seu (Portuguese for "All Yours") on TV Gazeta.

Biography 
Some of his greater successes include the hits Meu Bem – a Portuguese version of The Beatles' Girl – and A Praça. He quickly earned the nickname O pequeno príncipe, or Little Prince, after participating in an interview with Hebe Camargo. Ronnie started hosting his own television program in 1966, O Pequeno Mundo de Ronnie Von. Os Mutantes became a regular guest band on the show. Besides opening the door for the band, Ronnie Von also brought Gilberto Gil and Caetano Veloso to appear on the show regularly, which would be the beginnings of the Tropicália movement, even though he was never part of the movement. During this period, the press tried to create a supposed rivalry between him and Roberto Carlos.

In 1968, he released a self-titled album that broke from the naïveté of his previous work and ventured in more psychedelic and experimental sounds. Following this release came A Misteriosa Luta do Reino de Parassempre Contra o Império de Nuncamais (1969) and Máquina Voadora (1970). Though it did not meet with much success, today Ronnie's experimental work is being rediscovered by a new generation of rock listeners, rendering him a high degree of underground cult status.

Discography 
1966 – Ronnie Von – Meu Bem
1967 – O Novo Ídolo
1967 – Ronnie Von nº3
1968 – Ronnie Von
1969 – A Misteriosa Luta do Reino de Parassempre Contra o Império de Nuncamais
1970 – Máquina Voadora
1972 – Ronnie Von
1973 – Ronnie Von
1973 – Ronnie Von
1977 – Ronnie Von
1977 – Deje mi Vida – in Spanish
1978 – Ronnie Von
1981 – Sinal dos Tempos
1984 – Ronnie Von
1987 – Vida e Volta
1988 – Ronnie Von
1996 – Estrada da Vida
2019 – One Night Only

References

External links 

 Senhor F – 40 Years of "O Pequeno Mundo de Ronnie Von" (Portuguese)
 Complete discography of Ronnie Von (Portuguese) 
 Ronnie Von in CliqueMusic (Portuguese)

1944 births
Living people
20th-century Brazilian male singers
20th-century Brazilian singers
Brazilian rock musicians
Brazilian businesspeople 
Brazilian television presenters
Jovem Guarda
People from Niterói
Brazilian rock singers
Brazilian people of German descent
Brazilian people of Portuguese descent